Ectoedemia platea is a moth of the family Nepticulidae. It was described by James Brackenridge Clemens in 1861. It is known from North America.

It was described from a larva feeding on Quercus species, and might be just a synonym, probably of Ectoedemia anguinella. The larva is described as purplish with a pale green vascular line and a row of reddish-brown dorsal dashes. However, the purple colour of the larva is not conclusive, as the colour is often produced in larvae which feed on leaves with autumnal colouration.

External links
"North American Moths". Moth Photographers Group. Mississippi State University.

Nepticulidae
Moths of North America
Moths described in 1861